Estradiol valerate/dienogest (EV/DNG), sold under the brand names Lafamme, Natazia and Qlaira among others, is a combination product of estradiol valerate, an estrogen, and dienogest, a progestogen, which is used in menopausal hormone therapy in and as a birth control pill to prevent pregnancy in women. It is taken by mouth.

Birth control pills containing EV/DNG are associated with a significantly increased risk of venous thromboembolism. However, they are associated with a significantly lower risk of venous thromboembolism than birth control pills containing ethinylestradiol and a progestin.

See also
 Estradiol valerate/cyproterone acetate
 Estradiol/nomegestrol acetate
 List of combined sex-hormonal preparations

References

External links
 

Bayer brands
Combined estrogen–progestogen formulations